Wiltondale is a settlement on western Newfoundland in the Canadian province of Newfoundland and Labrador. It is located at the intersection between Route 430 (Great Northern Peninsula Highway/Viking Trail) and Route 431 (Bonne Bay Road).

The community takes its name from its first settler, Norman Wilton, who moved to the area from Woody Point in 1927. The family were relied upon to provide a way station for people travelling to the logging areas. For most of its existence employment to the town has been limited to logging, to supply the local sawmills and for pulpwood.

After Gros Morne National Park was established, tourism has become an important industry to the town. The community is just south of the park boundary and the Bonne Bay Development Association has established a museum and a pioneer village there. The community also provides some tourism services.

In the late 1950s, Stedman Payne settled in Wiltondale and opened a small store.  This store remained the centre of Wiltondale until the early 1990s.  The village also had a one-room school called Wiltondale All Grade, a non-denominational church and a sawmill.  A gas station was built and operated by the Payne family in the late 1970s.

In 1982 the population of Wiltondale had grown to 63.  That was the peak population of permanent residents in Wiltondale.

The church burnt down and the school was eventually closed and students were bussed to nearby Deer Lake.

Populated places in Newfoundland and Labrador